"Unbalance by Me" is the tenth single released by Japanese singer and cellist Kanon Wakeshima. It was released May 7, 2016.

Track listing

Personnel
 Kanon Wakeshima – Vocals, Cello, Piano, Lyrics

References 

2016 singles
2016 songs
Kanon Wakeshima songs
Warner Music Japan singles